The RSM Classic is a golf tournament on the PGA Tour, played in the autumn in Georgia. It debuted in October 2010 on St. Simons Island, Georgia at the Sea Island Golf Club. The tournament was known as the McGladrey Classic until 2015, when the title sponsor's name changed from McGladrey to RSM US.

Resident tour pros Davis Love III and Zach Johnson kicked off the event in March 2010, where they helped to unveil the tournament's new  which was painted by Rock Demarco. The inaugural event in 2010 was won by Heath Slocum, one stroke ahead of runner-up Bill Haas.

Since 2015, the event has been played over both the Seaside and Plantation courses at Sea Island, with the field expanded to 156 players. Between 2015 and 2019 and in 2021, it was the final official PGA Tour event of the calendar year, with only a few unofficial tournaments being held until the season resumed in January.

Winners

References

External links

Coverage on PGA Tour's official site

PGA Tour events
Golf in Georgia (U.S. state)
Recurring sporting events established in 2010
2010 establishments in Georgia (U.S. state)